The Helen Holm Scottish Women's Open Amateur Stroke Play Championship is the national women's amateur stroke play golf championship in Scotland (although entry is open to overseas golfers). It has been played annually at Royal Troon since 1973 and is organised by the Scottish Golf.

The format is 54-hole stroke play contested over three days. It is played at Royal Troon with the first two rounds played on the Portland course and the final round on the Old course. Originally it was played over two days, with 36 holes on the first day.

The tournament is named after Helen Holm, a Scottish amateur golfer who was Scottish champion five times.

Winners

Source:

See also
Scottish Amateur Stroke Play Championship – the equivalent championship for men

References

External links
Scottish Golf Union
List of winners

Golf tournaments in Scotland
Amateur golf tournaments in the United Kingdom
Women's golf in the United Kingdom
Annual sporting events in the United Kingdom
1973 establishments in Scotland
Recurring sporting events established in 1973